CalFresh is the California implementation of the federal Supplemental Nutrition Assistance Program (SNAP), formerly known as the Food Stamp program, which provides financial assistance for purchasing food to low-income California residents.

Beneficiaries, who meet federal income eligibility rules, receive an electronic benefit that can be used to purchase foods at many markets and stores. The program is advertised to "help improve the health and well-being of qualified households and individuals by providing them a means to meet their nutritional needs." 

CalFresh is currently funded by a private/public partnership. Contractors, alongside community based subcontractors, contribute non-federal funds (State Share). The CDSS holds onto a portion of the reimbursements in order to fund a statewide hotline, develop materials, conduct trainings, and enhance outreach programs.

History 
Originally the Food Stamp Program was established by Henry Wallace, Secretary of Agriculture, in 1939 under the Roosevelt administration. Food stamps were first introduced in Rochester, New York. This program was then later readdressed by the introduction of the food stamp pilot programs in 1961, under the Kennedy administration.  Later on 31 January 1964, President Johnson proposed to Congress to pass legislation that would make the food stamp programs permanent. In April 1965, the program participation reached half a million, eventually reaching 15 million in October, 1974. Beginning in 1990, electronic benefit transfer cards replaced paper food stamps, prompting a change in name of the program to the Supplemental Nutrition Assistance Program. 

CalFresh was formally established in the Food Stamp Reform Act of 1977. CalFresh was originally designed to act as a "safety net" against hunger for low income Americans in the state of California. Around the 1980's the original program was greatly expanded due to widespread and severe domestic hunger. Later in 2003, the CDSS and CDPH cooperated with the California Association of Food Banks to develop the first California Food Stamp Access Improvement Plan. As of 1 January 2013, this plan has been overseen by the CDSS and updated annually.

Eligibility
In order to be eligible for the CalFresh program, you must be a resident of California and meet one of the following requirements:

 A current bank balance under $2,001
 A current bank balance under $3,001 and sharing the household with a person over the age of 60 or a person with a disability
In order to be eligible for the CalFresh program as an immigrant, you must meet one of the following requirements:

 Have lived in the country (in a qualified status) for 5 years
 Currently receiving disability related assistance
 Are a child, under 18 years of age, and has been lawfully admitted to the place of legal residence
Recipients over the age of 60 are eligible to use their CalFresh benefits to purchase low-cost meals in certain restaurants using a California EBT card. 

In order to be eligible for the Restaurant Meals Program, you must:

 Be currently enrolled and receiving CalFresh benefits
 Have an active California EBT Card
 Be homeless, elderly (age 60 or older), or disabled
 Staying in a hotel known as a Single Room Occupancy SRO which does not have access to a kitchen
In order to be eligible for CalFresh as a student, you must:

 Be aged between 18 - 49 years old
 Enrolled in "higher education"
 Enrolled in at least "half time" of credits (determined by school)
 Receive Financial Aid that would meet an exemption 

Non-citizens such as tourists and undocumented individuals are not eligible for CalFresh. This will change soon after the passage of Assembly Bill 135 which will increase access to CFAP benefits for all California residents aged 55 years or older, regardless of immigration status. 

CalFresh households are subject to gross and net income determination tests. The maximum gross net income allowed by the program is 200% of the Federal Poverty Level. Households are subject to reporting changes: Semi-Annual Reporting and Change Reporting. Most households need to report the following three changes no more than 10 days after they happen.

The State Supplementation Program (SSP or SSI/SSP), also known as the SNAP cash-out program, is the state supplement to the SSI program and provides state funded supplemental food benefits to SSI recipients in lieu of SNAP benefits.

Eligibility for Immigrants 
As part of large-scale federal welfare reform in 1996, many documented non-citizen immigrants in California lost their eligibility for food stamps through the CalFresh program. Many activists criticized the change as a political attack on immigration, rather than a substantive effort to improve fiscal responsibility. Since then, access to food subsidy benefits have been mostly returned through the California Food Assistance program (CFAP). Under CalFresh, parents who are undocumented can apply for food stamps on behalf of their US-citizen children. Increased food subsidy access for undocumented immigrants will arrive soon after state-level legislative changes. The passage of Assembly Bill 135 is set to increase access to CFAP benefits for all California residents aged 55 years or older, regardless of immigration status.

There are about 2.3 million undocumented immigrants in California, and around 45% of undocumented immigrants and 64% of undocumented children are food insecure. These numbers are bolstered by the fact that undocumented children and DACA enrollees are currently ineligible for food stamp benefits. Policy advocacy organizations such as Nourish California are pushing the state government to expand state funding to cover all eligible immigrants, regardless of immigration status, to lower hunger in the state. Only about 11% of California's unauthorized immigrant population is over the age of 55.

Administration
The Supplemental Nutrition Assistance Program (SNAP) is a federal aid program administered by the U.S. Department of Agriculture (USDA), while CalFresh is administered jointly by the USDA, the California Department of Social Services (CDSS), and the welfare departments of the 58 counties of California:

Federal law mostly consists of the Food Stamp Act ( et seq.), and state law mostly consists of California Welfare and Institutions Code (WIC) Division 9, Part 6, Chapter 10 (WIC § 18900 et seq.). Federal regulations are codified in Code of Federal Regulations (CFR) Title 7 ( et seq.) and state regulations are not part of the California Code of Regulations (CCR) but are separately published as the CDSS Manual of Policies and Procedures (MPP) and are "available for public use in the office of the welfare department of each county". The MPP includes the Eligibility and Assistance Standards Manual (MPP divisions 40-50, 81-82, 89-91), the Food Stamp Manual (MPP division 63), and the Electronic Benefit Transfer System Manual (MPP division 16). In addition to this manual, the CDSS often communicates policy direction to counties through periodic All County Letters (ACLs), All County Information Notices (ACINs), and business letters.

See also

 Welfare in California
Supplemental Nutrition Assistance Program
California Department of Social Services
California Department of Public Health

References

External links
 
 Food Stamp Manual (alternate)
UC CalFresh Nutrition Education Program

Welfare in California
Supplemental Nutrition Assistance Program